"The Puritan" is a single by English band Blur. After being played by Damon Albarn at a poetry festival, speculation rose as to "The Puritan"'s release. It is the band's first single since 2010's "Fool's Day". It was announced the track would be premiered via a Twitter live feed. It was also accompanied by "Under the Westway" and was performed at Blur's 2012 summer shows.

The performances of "Under the Westway" and "The Puritan" on 2 July were the first live performances of new material by the whole band since 30 January 1999, when all four members played a fan-club only concert at Finchley Arts Depot, London. This was at the start of the 13 tour, in which all songs from that album bar two were premiered.

Reception
Matthew Horton of the NME wrote that the song was "initially jarring, with beats pulled straight out of a cracker, it soon unveils a "happy sad" – just one of many meta-lyrics – melody and the kind of ludicrous clowning bounce that Blur have always managed alongside the more world-weary stuff." Horton also stated that the song "pulls together the greatest titbits from the Blur catalogue, and finds room for traces of Gorillaz and all the other malarkey Damon Albarn's turned his magpie mind to. So it's bumped along by the kind of plastic electronic parp you could snap up on Freecycle, echoing Gorillaz' "Doncamatic" in its cheap-as-chips bop, and wigging out to a 'chorus' of frenzied fuzz-bass that'd slot nicely into the more annoying nooks of Think Tank."

Track listing

Personnel
Damon Albarn – lead vocals, synthesizers, acoustic guitar
Graham Coxon – electric guitar, backing vocals
Alex James – bass guitar
Dave Rowntree – drums

Charts

References

Blur (band) songs
2012 singles
Songs written by Damon Albarn
2012 songs
Parlophone singles